Bill Brittingham (5 September 1923 – 18 June 1996) was an Australian rules footballer in the Victorian Football League (VFL).

He played in the Essendon premiership teams of 1946, 1949 and 1950. He originally played at full forward, winning the league goal kicking award in 1946, then switched full back in his latter years.

References

External links

Bill Brittingham's profile at Essendon FC

Essendon Football Club players
Essendon Football Club Premiership players
Warrnambool Football Club players
Australian rules footballers from Victoria (Australia)
1923 births
1996 deaths
Three-time VFL/AFL Premiership players